William T. Gormley (born August 7, 1950) is a University Professor at Georgetown University.  Gormley, a scholar of child care and education, is also the co-director of the Center for Research on Children.  Gormley is an advocate of Pre-kindergarten, and has extensively studied programs in Oklahoma, calling it a "beacon for early childhood advocates."

Biography
Gormley grew up in Pittsburgh, Pennsylvania, and received his B.A from the University of Pittsburgh in political science in 1972.  In 1976, he received his Ph.D. from the University of North Carolina at Chapel Hill, also in political science.  He then taught at the State University of New York and the University of Wisconsin, from 1980 to 1990.  In 1991, Gormley became a Professor of Government and Public Policy at Georgetown University, where he still teaches. He served as interim dean of the Georgetown Public Policy Institute from 2008-2010.  Gormley's wife is a professor at George Mason University, and he has a stepson and a daughter. In 2000, Gormley was elected as a fellow of the National Academy of Public Administration.

Publications

Books
Voices for Children: Rhetoric and Public Policy (Brookings Institution Press, 2012).
Bureaucracy and Democracy: Accountability and Performance with Steven Balla (Washington, D.C.: Congressional Quarterly Press, 3rd ed., 2013): Analysis of bureaucracy centered "around four prominent social theories: bounded rationality, principal-agent theory, interest group mobilization, and network theory."
Politics and Public Policy with Carl Van Horn and Donald Baumer (Washington, D.C.:Congressional Quarterly Press, 2001, 3rd edition).
Organizational Report Cards with David Weimer (Cambridge, Mass.: Harvard University Press, 1999)).
Everybody's Children: Child Care as a Public Problem (Washington, D.C.: The Brookings Institution, 1995).
Privatization and its Alternatives edited (Madison: University of Wisconsin Press, 1991): Presents 14 different perspectives on privatization.  Gormley provides a "unifying framework" in his introduction.
Taming the Bureaucracy: Muscles, Prayers, and Other Strategies (Princeton: Princeton University Press, 1989).
The Midwest Response to the New Federalism edited with Peter Eisinger (Madison: University of Wisconsin Press, 1988).
The Politics of Public Utility Regulation (Pittsburgh: University of Pittsburgh Press, 1983).
The Effects of Newspaper-Television Cross-Ownership on News Homogeneity (Chapel Hill: Institute for Research in Social Science, 1976).

References

1950 births
Living people
American political scientists
University of Pittsburgh alumni
University of North Carolina at Chapel Hill faculty
University of Wisconsin–Madison faculty
Georgetown University faculty
Deans of the McCourt School of Public Policy